Aughrim Ringforts are a pair of ringforts forming a National Monument located in County Galway, Ireland.

Location
Aughrim Ringforts are located on farmland 900 m (½ mile) south of Aughrim, County Galway, on Aughrim Hill. They are 335 m apart.

History
Ringforts were built in Ireland in the 6th–12th century as protected farmsteads. The Aughrim forts provide commanding views over the surrounding countryside and overlooking the Melehan River, a tributary of the Suck.

Description

Aughrim Fort

It is also known as General St. Ruth's Fort, after the Marquis de St Ruth; it was here that the Irish Jacobites placed their cannon at the 1691 Battle of Aughrim, and St Ruth was fatally shot in the field  to the northeast.

Lisbeg

References

National Monuments in County Galway
Archaeological sites in County Galway